WAT Stadlau (short for Wiener ASKÖ Team Stadlau) is a sport club in Vienna Donaustadt, Austria. The club celebrated his biggest success in ice hockey and judo. The ice hockey team played in the Austrian Hockey League, the top level of ice hockey in Austria, and the Austrian National League, the second level Austrian league. The ice hockey division folded in 1991.

Achievements: Ice Hockey
1971-72: 3rd place in Austrian Hockey League

1979-80: 1st place in Austrian National League

Achievements: Judo
 1983: 8th place Austrian National League (men)
 1988: 8th place Austrian National League (men)
 2013: 2nd place Austrian League (women)
 2015: 3rd place Austrian League (women)

External links
Homepage of WAT Stadlau
Club profile on Hockeyarenas.net

References

Defunct ice hockey teams in Austria
Former Austrian Hockey League teams
Austrian National League teams
Sport in Vienna